Sahitya Akademi Award is given each year, since 1955, by the Sahitya Akademi, India's National Academy of Letters, to writers and their works, for their outstanding contribution to the upliftment of Indian literature and Punjabi literature in particular. it as well as for translations. This is the second highest literary award of India, after Jnanpith Award. No awards were given in years, 1957, 1958, 1960, 1966.

Recipients

References

External links 

 

Punjabi-language writers
Punjabi literature